The Atlantic Ocean Tunnel is an undersea tunnel that is part of Norwegian County Road 64 which connects Kristiansund Municipality to Averøy Municipality in Møre og Romsdal county, Norway. The eastern end of the tunnel is on Kirkelandet island in the town of Kristiansund and the western end of the tunnel is on the island of Averøya, just west of the village of Sveggen. Construction began in 2006, and the tunnel opened on 19 December 2009, later than initially estimated. Breakthrough was in March 2009. Problems with water leaks caused delays and cost overruns.

As of July 1., 2020, the tunnel is no longer a toll tunnel and driving through the tunnel is free for all types of vehicle.

References

External links
 
Statens vegvesen: Rv. 64 Atlanterhavstunnelen 
Article November 2008
Norway's newest undersea road tunnel opens
Western end: , Eastern end: 

Road tunnels in Møre og Romsdal
Subsea tunnels in Norway
Averøy
Buildings and structures in Kristiansund
2009 establishments in Norway
Norwegian County Road 64
Tunnels completed in 2009